Jack Jones also known as Jackie Jones was an Australian rugby league footballer who played in the 1920s and 1930s. He played for South Sydney in the NSWRL competition during the club's first golden era where they won 7 premierships in 8 seasons.

Playing career
Jones made his first grade debut for South Sydney against Balmain in Round 1 1925 at the Sydney Cricket Ground.  Jones played 6 times for Souths in 1925 as the club went undefeated throughout the season and won the premiership without needing to play in a grand final.

Jones missed out on playing in the club's 1926, 1927 and 1928 premiership victories but returned to feature more prominently in 1929.  Jones played at five-eighth in the 1929 NSWRL grand final against Newtown which was played at the Sydney Sports Ground.  South Sydney convincingly won the match 30-10 claiming their 5th premiership in a row.

Souths would again win premierships in 1931 and 1932 but Jones missed out on playing in those grand final victories.  Jones retired at the end of the 1933 season.  In total, Jones played 51 times for Souths across all grades.

References

South Sydney Rabbitohs players
Year of birth missing
Year of death missing
Place of birth missing
Place of death missing
Rugby league locks
Rugby league five-eighths
Rugby league halfbacks